Hisar Military Station,  established in 15 November 1982 at Hisar in Haryana state of India, is the base headquarters of the 33rd Armoured Division of Mathura-headquartered I Corps strike battle formation of Jaipur-headquartered South Western Command of Indian Army.

History
It was raised on 15 November 1982 by Major General L. B. Sondhi. It was converted into a fully Armoured Division in December 1993.

Facilities

Married Accommodation

Hisar Military station has 2366 married Dwelling Units (DU) of 152,200.000 Sqm carpet area for Officers, JCO’s & other ranks.

Construction started in 2006 and work was completed in four packages (Pkg-II, III, IV & V) in April, 2009 at the cost o Rs. 250 crores at 2009 price.

The scope of work comprises building work of RCC Frame structure construction (G+2 Storied), underground/overhead RCC reservoirs, Internal & External electrification, Internal & External Water supply, Road/Path/Culvers, Plumbing work, Sewage works etc. Whole project completed in 30 months period without any penalty.

After waiting over a year for the authorities to act on a complaint of alleged irregularities and corruption at the Hisar Military Station, a Colonel has petitioned the President and the Defence Ministry seeking their intervention. The Army has denied the allegations.

Schools
Kendriya Vidyalaya, Military Station, Hisar and Army Public School, Hisar provide the school education within the cantonment.

Kendriya Vidyalaya, Military Station, Hisar provides education facilities in the cantonment area under Kendriya Vidyalaya system.

Army Public School, Hisar was also established in 1990 within the cantonment area to provide education facilities.

Medical and Hospital Care
In 2011, a 250-bedded Military Hospital, Hisar was inaugurated to provide medical facilities. 
The Military Hospital in Hisar is the 111th hospital of the Army. When fully commissioned the hospital will have nine specialities. It will also have a Blood Bank, an ICU and a Physiotherapy Department.

Ex-servicemen Contributory Health Scheme (ECHS) for the Ex-Services & Their Families
In addition to Military Hospital, Hisar, Central medical Center near Dabra Chowk, NC Jindal Institute of Eye Care at Model Town and Dr. kalra's Sarvodya Multispeciality Hospital opposite Red Cross on Delhi Road in Hissar town are also on the official list of hospitals empannelled to provide the medical care to the ex-servicemen and their families under the Ex-servicemen Contributory Health Scheme (ECHS),

CSD Canteen
CSD Canteen, Hisar depot run by the Canteen Stores Department (India) is on the Delhi Road, just opposite the Police Post.

With effect from 1 January 2009, following are the new monetary limits for buying Non-AFD Items (groceries and low value items) and AFD (Against Firm Demand) Items from the CSD stores. An AFD item can be bought only on the CSD Smart Card of the original cardholder.

Golf Course
There is an 18 hole Hisar Army Golf Course.

Army Skill Training Centre (ASTC)

Hisar DOT Division inaugurated its Army Skill Training Centre (ASTC) on 20 October 2018 which imparts employable skills to the spouses and dependents of working army men & veterans. The ASTC runs
National Skill Development Agency (NSDA)'s National Skills Qualification Framework (NSQF) recognised skill development course under the Pradhan Mantri Kaushal Vikas Yojna of Government of India. Those who successfully complete the courses will conferred Certificates as well as facilitated with placement and self employment opportunities.

See also

 I Corps
 Brigade of the Guards
 Ambala Air Force Station
 Sirsa Air Force Station
 Raja Nahar Singh Faridabad Air Force Logistics Station
 List of Armed Forces Hospitals In India
 List of Indian Air Force stations
 List of Indian Navy bases
 Airports in Haryana
 Railway in Haryana
 Road Highways and Expressways in Haryana

References

Military units and formations established in 1982
Indian Army bases
Cantonments of India
Hisar (city)
1982 establishments in Haryana